Al Sah-him may refer to:

 
 Al Sah-him (Arrowverse), the League of Assassins name given to Oliver Queen